Artem Zakharov may refer to:
Artem Zakharov (footballer) (born 1996), Ukrainian footballer
Artem Zakharov (swimmer), Russian, participated in Swimming at the 2008 Summer Paralympics – Men's 100 metre breaststroke SB6

See also 
Artsyom Zakharaw (born 2002), Belarusian footballer
Artyom Zakharov (born 1991), Kazakhstani cyclist